Alice Ruth Bolton (born May 25, 1967), known as Ruthie Bolton,  is an American former professional women's basketball player. Born in Lucedale, Mississippi, she played at the collegiate, Olympic and professional levels of women's basketball. Bolton played in the Women's National Basketball Association (WNBA) from 1997 through 2004 with the Sacramento Monarchs. She played collegiately at Auburn University, teaming with her older sister, Mae Ola Bolton. She was inducted into the Women's Basketball Hall of Fame in 2011. Bolton has also served as a first lieutenant in the United States Army Reserves as a transportation officer.

Professional career
Bolton started her professional career for the Visby Ladies in Sweden during the 1990–91 season. The following season, she played in Hungary, becoming the first USA woman to play professionally in the country. She spent the 1992–93 season with C.A. Fainzia in Italy, averaging 26 points per game.

In 1994, Bolton moved to Italy to play for Erreti Faenza. During the 1993–94 season, she averaged 28 points and 7.1 rebounds per game. She stayed with Faenza the following season where she averaged 25.5 points and 6.0 rebounds per game. During the 1995–96 season, Bolton played in Turkey.

She went on to play eight seasons in the WNBA with the Sacramento Monarchs.

WNBA career statistics

Regular Season

|-
| align="left" | 1997
| align="left" | Sacramento
| 23 || 23 || 35.3 || .402 || .344 || .768 || 5.8 || 2.6 || 2.3 || 0.0 || 2.5 || 19.4
|-
| align="left" | 1998
| align="left" | Sacramento
| 5 || 4 || 26.6 || .293 || .154 || .607 || 2.2 || 1.2 || 1.2 || 0.0 || 1.4 || 11.0
|-
| align="left" | 1999
| align="left" | Sacramento
| 31 || 30 || 31.3 || .364 || .321 || .798 || 4.3 || 2.4 || 1.0 || 0.0 || 1.4 || 13.6
|-
| align="left" | 2000
| align="left" | Sacramento
| 29 || 29 || 29.9 || .361 || .313 || .762 || 3.7 || 2.0 || 1.2 || 0.0 || 1.6 || 13.1
|-
| align="left" | 2001
| align="left" | Sacramento
| 31 || 0 || 18.8 || .338 || .364 || .692 || 3.0 || 1.8 || 0.9 || 0.0 || 1.3 || 7.2
|-
| align="left" | 2002
| align="left" | Sacramento
| 32 || 1 || 23.0 || .396 || .326 || .727 || 2.9 || 1.2 || 1.4 || 0.1 || 1.1 || 10.9
|-
| align="left" | 2003
| align="left" | Sacramento
| 33 || 0 || 15.8 || .314 || .192 || .769 || 1.7 || 1.1 || 1.0 || 0.1 || 0.6 || 4.5
|-
| align="left" | 2004
| align="left" | Sacramento
| 34 || 4 || 13.8 || .370 || .405 || .737 || 1.4 || 0.9 || 0.7 || 0.0 || 0.4 || 4.7
|-
| align="left" | Career
| align="left" | 8 years, 1 team
| 218 || 91 || 23.4 || .367 || .319 || .746 || 3.1 || 1.6 || 1.2 || 0.0 || 1.2 || 10.0

Postseason

|-
| align="left" | 1999
| align="left" | Sacramento
| 1 || 1 || 32.0 || .400 || .167 || 1.000 || 1.0 || 4.0 || 1.0 || 0.0 || 2.0 || 15.0
|-
| align="left" | 2000
| align="left" | Sacramento
| 2 || 2 || 35.0 || .382 || .286 || 1.000 || 4.5 || 3.5 || 2.0 || 0.0 || 2.5 || 19.5
|-
| align="left" | 2001
| align="left" | Sacramento
| 5 || 0 || 24.2 || .386 || .391 || .923 || 4.4 || 1.8 || 0.8 || 0.0 || 2.0 || 11.0
|-
| align="left" | 2003
| align="left" | Sacramento
| 6 || 0 || 15.2 || .214 || .250 || .000 || 1.7 || 1.0 || 0.3 || 0.0 || 0.8 || 2.5
|-
| align="left" | 2004
| align="left" | Sacramento
| 6 || 0 || 8.8 || .167 || .000 || .750 || 0.7 || 0.5 || 0.7 || 0.0 || 0.5 || 1.5
|-
| align="left" | Career
| align="left" | 5 years, 1 team
| 20 || 3 || 18.4 || .324 || .266 || .929 || 2.3 || 1.5 || 0.8 || 0.0 || 1.3 || 6.7

USA Basketball

Bolton was named to the team representing the US at the World University Games held during July 1991 in Sheffield, England. While the USA team had won gold in 1983, they finished with the silver in 1985, in fifth place in 1987, and did not field a team in 1989. The team was coached by Tara VanDerveer of Stanford. After winning opening games easily, the USA faced China in the medal round. The USA shot only 36% from the field, but limited the team from China to 35%, and won 79–76 to advance to the gold medal game. There they faced 7–0 Spain, but won 88–62 to claim the gold medal. Bolton was the team's leading scorer with 14 points per game, just ahead of Lisa Leslie's 13 points per game.

In 1994, Bolton-Holifield was named to the national team which competed in the World Championships in Sydney, Australia. The team was coached by Tara VanDerveer. The team won their early games, then advanced to the medal rounds and faced Brazil. Despite  17 points from Bolton-Holifield and 29 from Katrina McClain, the USA fell 110–107 when Brazil hit ten of ten free throws in the final minute. The USA went on to defeat Australia 100–95 to claim the bronze medal.

Bolton continued with the national team to the 1996 Olympics in Atlanta, Georgia. Bolton was the leading scorer in the game against the Ukraine, with 21 points. She helped the team win all eight games to win the gold medal for the USA team. Bolton averaged 12.8 points per game and led the team in steals with 23.

The national team traveled to Berlin, Germany in July and August 1998 for the FIBA World Championships. The USA team won a close opening game against Japan 95–89, then won their next six games easily. In the semifinal game against Brazil, the USA team was behind as much as ten points in the first half. Bolton hit a three pointer in the second half to give her team the lead, as part of a 16-point scoring effort, and the USA went on to win 93–79. The gold medal game was a rematch against Russia. In the first game, the USA team dominated almost from the beginning, but in the rematch, the team from Russia took the early lead and led much of the way. With under two minutes remaining, the USA was down by two points when Bolton  hit a three pointer to give the USA a lead. Russia tied the game, but Bolton hit another three to give the USA a lead they would not give up. The USA held on to win the gold medal 71–65.

Bolton continued with the national team to the 2000 Olympics in Sydney, Australia. The USA won all eight games, including the gold medal game against host Australia to win the gold medal. Bolton averaged 5.0 points per game.

Auburn statistics
Source

Current activities 

After being released by the Monarchs as an active player in 2005, she returned to the Monarchs to work in their front office, specializing in public relations. In 2004 and 2005, she served as the head coach for the women's basketball team at William Jessup University, a California Pacific Conference school in Rocklin, California. Currently Bolton is the head coach for women's basketball at Vacaville Christian High School in Vacaville, California; she also dabbles in gospel singing.

Ms. Bolton has also been an active participant in the Sport Diplomacy Sports Envoy program for the U.S. Department of State. In this function, she has traveled to Armenia, Australia, China, Moldova, Kazakhstan, Papua New Guinea, and Saudi Arabia to conduct basketball clinics for approximately 1300 youth and women worldwide. In so doing, Bolton helped contribute to the Sport Diplomacy's mission to promote greater understanding and inclusion through sport and supported the U.S. foreign policy goal of advancing the status of women and girls around the world.

She currently lives in Sacramento, California.

Ruthie Bolton continues to work with the Golden State Warriors participating in many of their youth camps.  She also continues to do her 'AIM HIGH' program at many junior high and high schools throughout Sacramento County and beyond.  Ruthie Bolton is now endorsing the opening of "Ruthie's Place" which will be located in the Oak Park area of Sacramento.  Ruthie's Place will be a place for (1) Trauma Informed Domestic Violence Support Center for women and families (2) The first youth drop in support services center for girls and LGBTQ youth that are being exploited and sex trafficked throughout Sacramento County  (3) Boutique Thrift Center that is a social renewal model (Teach one, reach one).  Ruthie is collaborating with A Community For Peace (ACFP) on Ruthie's Place. www.acommunityforpeace.org.

In 2014, Ruthie was inducted into the Multi-Ethnic Sports Hall of Fame.

Ruthie Bolton is a published author who has written two books (1) From Pain to Peace and (2) The Ride of a Lifetime.

References

External links 

WNBA player profile
Coaching profile at William Jessup University
January 7, 2006 Sacramento Bee article

1967 births
Living people
African-American basketball players
American expatriate basketball people in Hungary
American expatriate basketball people in Italy
American expatriate basketball people in Sweden
American expatriate basketball people in Turkey
American women's basketball coaches
American women's basketball players
Auburn Tigers women's basketball players
Basketball coaches from Mississippi
Basketball players at the 1996 Summer Olympics
Basketball players at the 2000 Summer Olympics
Basketball players from Mississippi
Galatasaray S.K. (women's basketball) players
Medalists at the 1996 Summer Olympics
Medalists at the 2000 Summer Olympics
Olympic gold medalists for the United States in basketball
People from Lucedale, Mississippi
Sacramento Monarchs players
Shooting guards
Sportspeople from Elk Grove, California
Universiade gold medalists for the United States
Universiade medalists in basketball
Women's National Basketball Association All-Stars
Medalists at the 1991 Summer Universiade
21st-century African-American people
21st-century African-American women
20th-century African-American sportspeople
20th-century African-American women
20th-century African-American people
United States women's national basketball team players
United Service Organizations entertainers